Duty is a philosophical and legal concept.

Duty may also refer to:

Places
Duty (village), a village in Zabaykalsky Krai, Russia
Duty, Virginia, a community in the United States

People with the surname 
 John David Duty (1952–2010), American who was executed in Oklahoma for first-degree murder
 Kenton Duty (born 1995), American actor, singer, and dancer
 Margie Duty (1922–2001), African American law enforcement officer

Arts, entertainment, and media
Duty (1986 film) a 1986 Bollywood Hindi Indian Film Directed By Ravikant Nagaich
Duty (album), a 2000 album by Ayumi Hamasaki
Duty (film), a 2003 British television film part of the Hornblower series
"Duty" (short story), a short story by Frederick Forsyth

Business
Duty (tax), a form of taxation
Air Passenger Duty, an excise duty in the United Kingdom
Duty-free permit,  a permit that allows its holder to import a vehicle in Sri Lanka on duty concessions
Duty-free shop, retail outlets that are exempt from the payment of certain local or national taxes and duties
Stamp duty, a form of tax on documents
Succession duty, an inheritance tax levied in the English fiscal system
Vehicle Excise Duty, an excise duty on a vehicle in the United Kingdom, known as road tax or tax disc

Law
 
 Duty (criminal law), an obligation to act
 Duty of care, in tort law
 Duty of care (business associations), obligation owed to a corporation by its directors
 Duty of disclosure, an obligation to reveal certain information

Other uses
Active duty, a military concept in the United States
Vehicle duty, terminology for classifying vehicles according to gross vehicle weight rating; see truck classification

See also
 Duty cycle, the fraction of one period in which a signal or system is active
 Jury duty (disambiguation)
 Heavy duty (disambiguation)
 HD (disambiguation)